Isbister is a settlement in eastern Whalsay in the parish of Nesting in the Shetland islands of Scotland. It lies on the eastern side of Loch of Isbister. The ancestral home of the great Adam Isbister, also known as A.

References

External links

Canmore - Whalsay, Isbister, Nisthouse site record
Canmore - Whalsay, Isbister site record

Villages in Whalsay